Motherwell is a township in the Eastern Cape province of South Africa. It forms part of the Nelson Mandela Bay Metropolitan Municipality which is the metropolitan area comprising Port Elizabeth, Despatch, Uitenhage and other surrounding towns.

History 
Motherwell was planned to accommodate the black squatters who were relocated from Zwide (and Veeplaas), and construction began in 1984. It is the largest settlement in terms of population and land area in Port Elizabeth.

Geography 
Motherwell is a township with about 140000 inhabitants (2011) about 25 km north of the Port Elizabeth city centre and is situated on the northern outskirts of the city's metropolitan area.

It is separated into blocks called "NU"s [Neighbourhood Units] (e.g. NU5 or NU8).

Neighbouring include Swartkops River nature reserve in the south-west and Markman Industrial Park in the east. Further but nearby communities include Amsterdamhoek/Bluewater Bay, Swartkops, Wells Estate/Saint George's Strand and Coega.

Facilities 
Motherwell has a number of public schools, both at primary and secondary level. It also has a clinic; a day hospital; library; numerous public parks; community centers.

Retail
Retailers such as Shoprite, Spar, PEP, and national restaurant chains Debonairs Pizza, Steers, and Kentucky Fried Chicken have a presence in Motherwell.

National Commercial Banks Standard Bank (founded in Port Elizabeth); ABSA; Capitec Bank; First National Bank; and Nedbank have branches and multiple ATMs available.

References

Populated places in Nelson Mandela Bay
Townships in the Eastern Cape
Populated places established in 1984